Carnaval is a 2021 Brazilian comedy film directed by , written by Peu Barbalho, Audemir Leuzinger, Luisa Mascarenhas and Leandro Neri and starring Lipy Adler, Nikolas Antunes and Giovana Cordeiro. The film was digitally released on June 2, 2021, by Netflix.

Cast 
 Lipy Adler as Marcão
  as Jorge
  as Nina
 Bruna Inocencio as Mayra
 Gessica Kayane as Michelle
 Rafael Medrado as Samir
  as Freddy Nunes
  as Vivi
  as Luana
  as Salvador

Reception

References

External links 
 
 

2021 films
2021 comedy films
Brazilian comedy films
2020s Portuguese-language films
Portuguese-language Netflix original films